Can't Help Singing is a 1944 American musical Western film directed by Frank Ryan and starring Deanna Durbin, Robert Paige, and Akim Tamiroff. Based on a story by John D. Klorer and Leo Townsend, the film is about a senator's daughter who follows her boyfriend West in the days of the California gold rush. Durbin's only Technicolor film, Can't Help Singing was produced by Felix Jackson and scored by Jerome Kern with lyrics by E. Y. Harburg.

The movie was one of the most expensive in Universal's history.

Plot
Set during the early years of the California Gold Rush, the film tells of the adventures of Caroline Frost, the wilful and spoilt daughter of a US Senator. He does not approve of her beau, Lt Robert Latham, of the US cavalry, and persuades President James K. Polk to post Latham to guard gold shipments from the California mines owned by Jake Carstair.

Caroline travels by train and steamboat and manages to join a wagon-train about to trek overland to the West. She shares a wagon with Johnny (Robert Paige), a debonair but ruthless gambler with whom she falls in love, and two comically inept opportunists, Prince Gregory Stroganovsky and his much put-upon servant Koppa.

At first, she tells Johnny she is engaged to Carstair. However, no unattached women are allowed to join the wagon train, so Johnny tells everyone she is married to the Prince and she is forced to go along with the ruse.

Eventually, she eventually reaches Sonora, California. Here, her problems are quickly sorted out. After some confusion between Carstair and his real wife, Caroline decides that she really loves Johnny. Her father, who has followed her, is reconciled.

Cast
 Deanna Durbin as Caroline Frost
 Robert Paige as Johnny Lawlor
 Akim Tamiroff as Prince Gregory Stroganovsky
 David Bruce as Lt. Robert Latham
 Leonid Kinskey as Koppa
 June Vincent as Jeannie McLean
 Ray Collins as Sen. Martin Frost
 Andrew Tombes as Sad Sam
 Thomas Gomez as Jake Carstairs
 Clara Blandick as Aunt Cissy Frost
 Olin Howlin as Bigelow, the Wagonmaster
 George Cleveland as U.S. Marshal
 Chester Conklin as Poker Player (uncredited) 
 Heinie Conklin as Waiter (uncredited) 
 Edward Earle as President Polk (uncredited) 
 Robert Homans as Albert (uncredited)

Production
The film was known as Caroline. Jerome Kern signed to write music in September 1943. In October, Frank Ryan was assigned to direct.

In December Jack Yellen signed to do the script.

In March 1944 the title was changed to Can't Help Singing. David Bruce was cast the same month. Universal had traditionally borrowed leading men to appear opposite Durbin but for this film they used contract players Bruce and Robert Paige.

Filming locations
 Johnson Canyon, Cascade Falls, Duck Creek, Strawberry Point, Navajo Lake (Utah), and Cedar Breaks in Utah.
 Big Bear Lake, Big Bear Valley, San Bernardino National Forest, California, USA 
 Lake Arrowhead, San Bernardino National Forest, California, USA

Reception

Critical response
The Los Angeles Times called it "delightful". Bosley Crowther of The New York Times said of Durbin's singing as "thoroughly pleasing" and the film "gaudy".

Home media
Can't Help Singing was released on VHS on January 25, 1997, by Universal Studios Home Entertainment. The film was released on DVD on September 6, 2016, by Universal Studios Home Entertainment.

Awards and nominations
 1946 Academy Award Nomination for Best Music, Scoring of a Musical Picture (Jerome Kern and Hans J. Salter)
 1946 Academy Award Nomination for Best Music, Original Song (Jerome Kern and E.Y. Harburg)

See also
List of American films of 1944

References

External links
 
 
Can't Help Singing at Letterbox DVD

1944 films
Universal Pictures films
1940s Western (genre) musical films
Films set in California
Films set in the 1840s
Films set in the 1850s
Films shot in Utah
American Western (genre) musical films
Films scored by Hans J. Salter
Films directed by Frank Ryan
1940s English-language films
1940s American films